Walter of Speyer (Walt(h)er von Speyer, Gualterus Spirensis) (967–1027) was a German bishop of Speyer and poet.

Works
De sizzugiis
Vita et Passio Sancti Christophori Martyris

References
 Wilhelm Harster, Walther von Speier, ein Dichter des X. Jahrhunderts (1877)

External links

Biography (French language)

967 births
1027 deaths
10th-century German bishops
11th-century German bishops
11th-century Latin writers
11th-century German poets
Roman Catholic bishops of Speyer
German poets
German male poets